Kirkland Lake is a town and municipality in Timiskaming District of Northeastern Ontario. The 2016 population, according to Statistics Canada, was 7,981.

The community name was based on a nearby lake which in turn was named after Winnifred Kirkland, a secretary of the Ontario Department of Mines in Toronto. The lake was named by surveyor Louis Rorke in 1907. Miss Kirkland never visited the town, and the lake that bore her name no longer exists because of mine tailings. The community comprises Kirkland Lake (Teck Township), as well as Swastika, Chaput Hughes, Bernhardt, and Morrisette Twp.

Kirkland Lake was built on gold, but it is equally well known for producing world-famous hockey players. Indeed, legendary hockey broadcaster Foster Hewitt called Kirkland Lake "the town that made the NHL." The town celebrated this via Hockey Heritage North which has been renamed in the meantime to Heritage North.

Until January 1, 1972, the town was known as Township of Teck. A by-law was introduced, on July 20, 1971, to change the municipality's name to Town of Kirkland Lake, effective January 1, 1972.

History

Gold in the Kirkland Lake region was originally reported in the late 1800’s by Chief Ignace Tonené of the Temagami First Nation. In fact, he staked a claim near the north arm of Larder Lake but stated it was jumped (stolen). He reported this, but no action was taken. Chief Tonene Lake was named in his honour. Chief Ignace Tonené would go on to help form Beaverhouse First Nation.

Later, Tom Price discovered a boulder containing gold on a visit to the Kirkland Lake area in 1906.

In 1911, important claims were made along the Main Break. John Hunton staked claims on 18 Feb. 1911, which were incorporated as the Hunton Gold Mines Ltd. in April 1914, eventually becoming part of the Amalgamated Kirkland. Stephen Orr filed claims on 22 Feb. 1911, the basis for the Teck-Hughes Mine and the Orr Gold Mines Ltd, which was incorporated in June 1913. George Minaker staked claims on 23 Feb. 1911, part of which he sold to (Sir) Harry Oakes in Sept. 1912, becoming part of the Lake Shore Mine. John Reamsbottom filed claims on 18 April 1911 which became part of the Teck-Hughes Mine.

It was at Teck-Hughes mine where miners and engineers developed Teck-Cable for sturdy electrical transmission. That type of cable is now used on electrical projects around the world. You can learn more about this teck-cable invention on YouTube.

C.A. McKane staked claims on 20 April 1911, which became the Kirkland Lake Gold Mine.  A. Maracle staked claims on 5 June 1911 which became part of the Townsite claims. Melville McDougall staked claims on 27 June 1911, which he transferred to Oakes on 6 Sept. 1912, and became the part of the Lake Shore Mine. Jack Matchett staked a claim on 7 July 1911, later acquired by Oakes, which became part of the Townsite Mine. On 10 July 1911, Dave Elliott staked claims which became the Macassa Mine.  "Swift" Burnside staked claims on 26–28 July 1911 which became part of the Tough-Oakes Burnside Mine. Bill Wright filed claims on 27–29 July 1911, and on 16 Sept. 1911 with his brother-in-law Ed. Hargreaves, which became part of the Sylvanite Mine. This claim extended into the lake's southeastern portion. More importantly, Wright found free gold near the future site of the Discovery Shaft. Ed. Horne staked a claim on 12 Oct. 1911, which became part of the Townsite Mine, and the incorporation of Kirkland Townsite Gold Mines Ltd. in 1917. On 8 Jan. 1912, Harry Oakes partnered with the Tough brothers plus Clem. Foster, who owned the Foster Silver Mine in Cobalt, staked claims which incorporated the No. 2 Vein and eventually led to the incorporation of Tough-Oakes Gold Mines Ltd. in 1913. Oakes filed additional claims on 30 July 1912, and Wright on 26 Aug. 1912, both within the lake and eventually becoming parts of the Lake Shore Mine.

By 1914, there was one mine in operation, the Tough-Oakes, which included electric power transmitted from Charlton.  A settlement had formed at the southwest arm of the lake, which included a post office, stores and a hotel.

In order to maximize taxation revenue from existing and potential mines in the area, the six square mile Municipal Corporation of the Township of Teck was formed with Wellington J. McLeod as the first reeve in 1919. Their first task was the establishment of public utilities, including roads and water pipes, in the rapidly growing area.
Kirkland Lake had numerous mines, in the early years, including the Teck-Hughes (1917–1968), Lake Shore (1918–1968), Kirkland Minerals (1919–1960), Wright-Hargreaves (1921–1965), Sylvanite (1927–1961), Tough-Oakes-Burnside (later Toburn) (1913–1953), and Macassa Mine (1933–1999).

The Kirkland Lake camp produced $636,667 worth of gold in 1918 and that rose to a value of $17,000,000 in 1930.  As Pain points out, "Kirkland Lake camp came to occupy a position of real importance in the mining world."  By 1934 the production had reached $34,000,000 and 2,000,000 tons were being milled annually.  Peak employment of 4761 wage earners occurred in 1939, but that dropped to 2064 by 1944.  The 1939 population was 24,200.

Early in the Second World War gold production in the area decreased due to personnel being lost to more essential war industries. In 1942, gold mining was declared a non-essential industry to the war effort which resulted in gold mines across the country being at a lower priority for personnel and supplies relative to producers of base metals. After the war, local soldiers returned to the newly created Federal area in the northern section of the town. The Kirkland Lake Cemetery is a member of the Commonwealth War Graves Commission and is the location of the graves of 12 soldiers, and 3 airmen of the Canadian forces who died during the Second World War.

Kirkland Lake's first fire hall was established in 1935 and the second fire hall in 1955.

In 1963 the open pit Adams Mine began developing its iron ore resources. The mine would stay in production until 1990.

The Kirkland Lake Community Complex, now the Joe Mavrinac Community Complex, opened in 1979. Home of the Kirkland Lake Aquatic Club (KLAC) which has been the starting point for Dominique Bouchard - Olympic Swimmer, Rodney Thomas - Canada Games Double Gold medalist and numerous other university Varsity level scholarship swimmers.

In the early eighties, LAC Minerals reopened the main shaft of the Lake Shore Mine and worked it from 1982 to 1987 to extract pockets of gold that had been left behind. Between 1987 and 1991 Vancouver based Eastmaque Gold Mines reprocessed tailings, or "slimes", from early inefficient mill operations, extracting 70,000 ounces of gold.

Between October and December 1988, Kirkland Lake was the filming location for the drama film Termini Station.

Residential and cottage areas on Goodfish Lake and Nettie Lakes and one street in Chaput Hughes were evacuated that afternoon. Kirkland Lake Gold and AuRico Gold, suspended operations due to fire damage to power lines and local schools were closed. On May 29, the state of emergency was lifted, as the fire was determined to be no longer a threat to Kirkland Lake, although it was not yet under control.

On December 18, 2012, the town council voted to have fluoride removed from the local water treatment facility, after a breakdown left the town with a bill of $360,000.

Geography
Kirkland Lake includes the townships of Teck, Bernhardt and Morrisette.

Kirkland Lake is located in the resource-rich Precambrian Shield, an ancient geological core of the North American continent. Rivers south of that elevation flow into a drainage basin which includes Lake Ontario and the Saint Lawrence River, while rivers north of the watershed flow into Hudson Bay.

Black spruce, jack pine, trembling aspen, white birch, white spruce, balsam poplar, and balsam fir are the dominant trees in the area. A prominent forest form in this part of the black spruce distribution is the black spruce/feathermoss climax forest, which characteristically exhibits moderately dense canopy and features a forest floor of feathermosses. Moose, beaver, muskrat, snowshoe hare, as well as numerous predators roam this area, including marten, ermine, fisher, otter, black bear, wolf, and lynx. The many wetlands and lakes support a diversity of bird species, such as great blue herons, ducks, geese, and that symbol of the north, the common loon. Ground and tree dwelling birds are also plentiful, including grouse, partridge, robins, blue jays, and Canada jays as well as birds of prey such as hawks.

Geology
Kirkland Lake is located within the Abitibi greenstone belt and the Abitibi gold belt.  The main geologic feature in the Kirkland Lake Camp is the Kirkland Lake Break, or Main Break.  This Break is a vein located along a thrust fault extending east to west and dipping steeply to the south.  The area mine shafts are all located along this Break.  Gold occurs in quartz veins in spatial relationship to this fault.  The major mines in 1960, trending east to west, included Toburn, Sylvanite, Wright-Hargreaves, Lake Shore, Teck Hughes, Kirkland Minerals, and Macassa.

In the early days of staking claims, most prospectors tried to understand the lateral extent of this east-west trending vein defining the Main Break, as well as the associated veins paralleling it, e.g. South Vein, No. 2 Vein, No. 6 Vein, No. 7 Vein, etc.  Most importantly, prospecting was extensive in the hopes the vein extended under the southern portion of Kirkland Lake.

Telluride minerals were present in the Tough-Oakes ore.  They are also present in the Sylvanite Mine, though sylvanite is not one of them.  The Sylvanite Mine started a 200-ton mill in 1927 and shafts reached 2000 feet by 1930.

Kirkland Lake Gold Mines Ltd. was incorporated in 1913 before the property was taken over by Cobalt's Beaver Consolidated Mines Ltd. after a shaft was sunk 80 feet.  They formed the Kirkland Lake Gold Mining Company in 1915 and the main shaft was sunk 800 feet, which prompted the building on a mill in 1919.  Shafts reached a depth of 1600 feet before the mine closed in 1924.  Operations restarted in 1926 with new financing organized by Dr. J.B. Tyrrell, and high-grade ore was found at 2475 feet.  By 1930, the mine had reached a depth of 4000 feet and had acquired the Chaput-Highes claim to the south.  The property was acquired by the Kirkland Minerals Corporation in 1956.

Tough-Oakes produced 213 tons of high-grade ore in 1914.  Operations included a five-stamp mill for amalgamation plus a cyanide plant.  However, the presence of high-grade ore in the vein terminated at the 300-foot level and the mine shut down in 1918.  This property was consolidated with Burnside's to form Tough-Oakes Burnside Gold Mines Ltd. in 1923 and the Burnside No. 3 shaft was deepened to 1000 feet.  The operation went bankrupt in 1928.  Operations restarted as the Toburn in 1932, as a subsidiary of the American Smelting and Refining Company.

Lake Shore Mines Ltd. was incorporated in Feb. 1914.  Oakes proceeded with sending a crosscut from his shaft on the South Vein towards the anticipated Main Break under the lake to the north.  This crosscut encountered high-grade ore and a 100-ton mill was in operation by March 1918.  Their No. 1 shaft reached a depth of 1600 feet and their No. shaft a depth of 1000 feet by 1930 and was considered "the wonder mine" by Pain.  There was 1600 feet of high-grade ore at the 1000-foot level and 2400 feet at the 2400-foot level.

Wright-Hargreaves Mines Ltd. was incorporated in 1916.  The Wright-Hargreaves Mine had a 100-ton a day mill operating by 1921 and shafts reached a depth of 2000 feet by 1930.  Almost 900 feet of high-grade ore was found between the 500-foot level down to 1750.

In 1916, the Teck-Hughes Mine built a 50-ton cyanide mill after the No. 1 shaft reached a depth of 500 feet.  In 1923, the company was reorganized as Teck-Highes Gold Mines Ltd, which included the Orr claim to the south.  The central shaft reached a depth of 2980 feet and a south shaft was sunk in 1928 to reach a depth of 3600 feet.  A 1000-ton per day mill was in operation by 1930.  High-grade ore of up to 1000 feet was found on six levels.

Macassa Mines Ltd. was organized in 1926, which included the Elliott claims.  Mill operations started in 1933 and acquired the United Kirkland Gold Mines Ltd. claims to the south.

The lake itself was gradually filled in by mill tailings, such that the water had disappeared by 1930.  By 1960, 1500 miles of underground workings were in the Kirkland Lake camp and 12 miles of direct hoisting shafts.  The Lake Shore and Wright-Hargreaves mines had the deepest working depths in the world, at 8,200 feet below the surface.

Climate
Kirkland Lake enjoys four distinct seasons. Spring and autumn offer a mix of warm sunny days and crisp, cool nights. Summers are comfortably warm, with dry air and temperatures reaching into the mid-20 degree Celsius range (mid 70s Fahrenheit). Winter temperatures may seem brisk, but high winds and high humidity are rare, allowing residents to take full advantage of outside recreational activities.

Demographics

Economy

The town experienced an economic decline in the late 1900s, with the closing of the original mines. That ended in 2001, when Foxpoint Resources (now Kirkland Lake Gold Inc. or KLG) bought five of the mining claims in the town and began intensive exploration work. KLG successfully resuscitated the local mining scene, finding new zones of mineralization that, combined with the steadily increasing price of gold, turned the town around. Today, Kirkland Lake is probably one of the most successful communities of its size in Northern Ontario. Some of the more recent developments include:
 Kirkland Lake Gold Ltd. continues to expand its operations. Since December 2002, the company’s confirmed gold reserves have increased by 160% to 2,022,000 tons with an average grade of 0.46 ounces per ton containing a total of 927,000 ounces of gold. In 2003, the Company started a $21 million, 3-year exploration program targeted at adding 15,000,000 tons of ore to reserves and resources. Currently, over 500 personnel are directly or indirectly employed at the mine site. Based on today’s resources, the mine has a 12-15 year life span. A recently announced $16 million expansion in its exploration activities is already paying dividends. The mine recently announced the discovery of the richest ore veins ever found in the history of the Kirkland Lake camp, a move which will significantly increase the mine’s life span.
While the forestry industry has been hard hit across Canada, the impact on Kirkland Lake has been mitigated by the conversion of the existing Tembec Forest Products Group's Kenogami sawmill into a value-added centre for the manufacturing of finger-jointed lumber. The new centre, located on the outskirts of KL, opened in July 2006. It will employ between 70 and 92 workers. Under an innovative Public-Private partnership, the municipality is working with Rosko Forestry Operations to establish a specialty sawmill in the Archer Drive Industrial Park that will sell into the Canadian market.
 The local tourism industry has provided a much needed depth to the local economy. Star attractions include the Museum of Northern History at the Sir Harry Oakes Chateau, the Miners' Memorial, and Heritage North (an  interactive facility telling the story of hockey in the north). Upcoming attractions include a refurbishment of the historical Toburn Headframe. Event based tourism is also strong. Some of the most popular draws include a drag racing event in the summer and a national snow cross racing event in the winter.
 Prospects for an expansion of the Town’s white-collar workforce are excellent. Two new high schools as well as a long-term care facility, and a new medical centre promise to make the community more attractive to professionals in the fields of medicine and education. Veterans Affairs Canada is also growing its client service operations. The local office is now the primary service bureau for over 100,000 clients across central and eastern Canada.

Through the 1990s, one of the town's dominant political and economic controversies surrounded a proposal to ship Toronto's garbage to the Adams Mine, an abandoned open pit mine in Boston Township just outside Kirkland Lake.

Kirkland Lake is also self-sufficient when it comes to power production with a generator that produces up to 117MW.

Kirkland Lake also has a shopping mall with stores including Dollarama, easyhome, Hart Stores, Giant Tiger, and Topper's Pizza. The mall also includes local businesses, such as Nail World, a nail salon, and Elegance by Jen, a local hairdresser. It is also the location of the Ontario Northland bus stop.

Arts and culture
 The Kirkland Lake area continues to support a strong tourist industry throughout the year. The summers are met with a number of anglers, hunters, and campers looking for adventure. Winters are especially popular as a result of the well maintained snow mobile trails in the area. There are also a number of tourist destinations in the area, including the recently developed Hockey Heritage North. It also has a strong community built on music. Local attractions include:
 Kirkland Lake Miners' Memorial.
 Blueberry Festival - an annual summer event at Esker Lakes Provincial Park.
 Toburn Mine - This mine was the first producing mine in Kirkland Lake and the old headframe is a recognized cultural asset.
 Wright-Hargreaves Park - Site of the former Wright-Hargreaves mine that used to be one of the most productive and deepest gold mines in the world.
 Homecoming Week - during the week of Canada Day (July 1).
 Winter Carnival - beginning in mid-February.

Homecoming Week

The Kirkland Lake Festivals Committee hosts an annual homecoming week. Many former residents return home for the celebrations. The 2019 homecoming week will be a celebration of the community's 100th anniversary.

Homecoming events included free kids events, Shakespeare in the Park, a BMX, skateboard and scooter extreme park competition, a local food fair, free kids matinees, splash park events, golf tournaments, A day in the park at the Toburn Mine site, fireworks and more. The Festivals Committee also hosts free Canada Day celebrations with fireworks.

Winter Carnival

The Kirkland Lake Festivals Committee hosts an annual winter carnival beginning in mid-February. With 18 days of events each year, Kirkland Lake's Winter Carnival is one of Canada's longest winter carnivals. Festivals and Events Ontario has honoured the event with multiple Top 100 Festival awards.

The 2018 Kirkland Lake Winter Carnival featured 18 days of events between February 15–March 4 including: the Alamos Gold $50,000 Ice Fishing Derby, Hockey Tournament, Kids Winter Jam Party featuring the Stars of Pop, 3 nights of Kabaret, Kirkland Lake Skating Club's Ice Show, fireworks, free sleigh rides, a comedy night, free skating parties, a magic show, free kids matinees and the NorthernTel Kids Carnival on the Family Day holiday.

Infrastructure

Transportation
Kirkland Lake is served by Ontario Northland bus and railway services (with the train station located in Swastika) and the Kirkland Lake Airport as well as local transportation for people with disabilities and local taxi services as well as connections to the Timmins/Victor M. Power Airport and Rouyn-Noranda Airports. Transportation is also provided to senior citizens and persons with disabilities, through Timiskaming Home Support, which is funded by the North East Local Health Integration Network.

Healthcare
The Kirkland and District Hospital serves the area.

Education
Kirkland Lake has two secondary schools, each catering to a different language group:  the École secondaire catholique l'Envolée du Nord, a French Catholic school; and the Kirkland Lake District Composite School, an English secondary school also featuring French immersion instruction (opened in 2006; from 1923 - 2006 students attended Kirkland Lake Collegiate and Vocational Institute, also known as KLCVI).

Elementary schools in Kirkland Lake include Central Public School (French immersion, public), Federal Public School (English, public), Sacred Heart School, (French immersion and English, Catholic), St. Jerome School (French immersion and English, Catholic), and Ecole Assomption (French, Catholic).

The community is also home to a campus of the Northern College of Applied Arts and Technology.

Northern College offers one-, two- and three-year programs in the fields of technology, business, human services, health and emergency services and veterinary sciences. Northern also offers post-diploma, apprenticeship, skills and job re-entry programs funded by the federal and provincial governments. The College also provides job related training. This includes providing the facilities for the delivery of third party programs, or the development of courses to meet the needs of a company.

Kirkland Lake also includes the Teck Centennial Public Library.

Media
The city's primary newspaper is Northern News. Formerly a daily paper, Northern News now publishes three times per week.

Radio
 FM 90.3 - CBCR-FM, CBC Radio One
 FM 93.7 - CBON-FM-1, Première Chaîne
 FM 101.5 - CJKL-FM, Hot Adult Contemporary

Television
The town is served by a rebroadcaster of CITO-TV (CTV) which is officially licensed to the outlying community of Kearns.

Notable people
John Allan - Canadian Forces officer who served as Commander of Maritime Command from 1979 to 1980.
 Ralph Backstrom - NHL hockey player
 Lee Barkell - figure skater (represented Canada - gold medals), high performance coach (Olympic level) 
 Mario Bernardi - conductor, pianist
 Buddy Boone - NHL hockey player
 Bill Brydge - NHL hockey player
 Toller Cranston - Olympic figure skater, painter
 Dan Daoust - NHL hockey player
 Dick Duff - NHL hockey player
 Bill Durnan - NHL goalie
 Murray Hall - NHL hockey player
 Ed Havrot - reeve (1970)
 Karl Brooks Heisey - Canadian mining engineer/executive
 Floyd "Bud" Hillman - AHL and NHL hockey player
 Larry Hillman - NHL and WHA -  hockey player and Winnipeg Jets first coach
 Wayne Hillman - NHL and WHA - hockey player
 Michael Hogan - actor
 Bob Howes - professional football player in the CFL and former head football coach for Queen's University 
 Kimmo Innanen - astrophysicist
 Daryl Kramp - politician (elected as the Prince Edward–Hastings MP in 2004)
 Megan Leslie - politician (elected as the Halifax MP in 2008)
 Michael Mahonen - actor
 Diane Marleau - politician
 Sara Mayhew - manga artist, writer, illustrator
 Kurtis McLean - NHL hockey player
 Bob Murdoch - NHL hockey player, coach
 Claude Noël - NHL hockey player, former coach of the Winnipeg Jets NHL franchise
 Sir Harry Oakes - mining millionaire
 Barclay Plager - NHL hockey player, coach
 Bill Plager - NHL hockey player
 Bob Plager (1943–2021) - NHL hockey player
 Daren Puppa - NHL hockey player
 Dick Redmond - NHL hockey player
 Mickey Redmond - NHL hockey player, sports broadcaster
 Ann Shipley - reeve, Teck Township (1943–1952)
 Terry Slater - hockey player and coach
 Alan Thicke - actor from Growing Pains and composer of TV theme songs Facts of Life and Different Strokes
 Mike Walton - NHL and WHA player
 Tom Webster (ice hockey) - NHL and WHA player, NHL coach and scout
 William Henry Wright - mining millionaire

In popular culture
Termini Station was filmed in Kirkland Lake.

See also
List of francophone communities in Ontario
Matachewan, Ontario
Cobalt silver rush
Porcupine Gold Rush
Red Lake, Ontario
Greenstone, Ontario
Hemlo, Ontario

References

External links

 

 
2012 wildfires
Communities in Timiskaming District
Mining communities in Ontario
Populated places established in 1919
Single-tier municipalities in Ontario
Towns in Ontario